Burak Eris (born 17 July 1989) is a Liechtensteiner footballer of Turkish descent who currently plays for FC Buchs in Switzerland.

International career
He was a member of the Liechtenstein national football team and holds two caps, making his debut in a friendly against Azerbaijan on 6 February 2013.

References

External links
 
 

1989 births
Living people
Liechtenstein footballers
Liechtenstein international footballers
Liechtenstein people of Turkish descent
Liechtenstein under-21 international footballers
Swiss men's footballers
Swiss people of Turkish descent
Association football midfielders
FC Balzers players
FC Chur 97 players
USV Eschen/Mauren players
FC Schaan players